Jeannie Suk Gersen (born 1973) is a professor of law at Harvard Law School.

Biography
Suk attended Hunter College High School, graduating in 1991. In 1995, Suk received her B.A. in Literature from Yale University, and a D.Phil at St Hugh's College, Oxford in 1999, where she was a Marshall Scholar. In 2002, she graduated with a J.D. degree from Harvard Law School. After law school, she clerked for Judge Harry T. Edwards of the U.S. Court of Appeals for the District of Columbia Circuit, and Justice David Souter of the U.S. Supreme Court during the 2003 term.

In 2006, Suk became an assistant professor at Harvard Law School, making her the second woman of minority background to join the faculty (after Lani Guinier). In 2010, Suk was granted tenure; she was the first Asian American woman awarded tenure in the law school's history. She is currently the John H. Watson, Jr. Professor of Law.

Career and writing
She was named one of the "Best Lawyers Under 40" by the National Asian Pacific American Bar Association and a "Top Woman of the Law" by Massachusetts Lawyers Weekly.

Her writing focuses on criminal law and family law.  In 2016, she co-wrote an article with her husband on modern regulation of sex that argued most practices are counter-productive. She has also published on intellectual property protection for fashion design. Suk is a contributing writer for New Yorker magazine.

Bibliography

Books
 Postcolonial Paradoxes in French Caribbean Writing: Césaire, Glissant, Condé, Oxford University Press, 2001. .
 At Home in the Law: How the Domestic Violence Revolution Is Transforming Privacy, Yale University Press, 2009. .

Essays and reporting
 
———————
Notes

Personal life
In 1999, Suk married Harvard Law School Professor Noah Feldman with whom she has two children. Her second marriage is to Sidley Austin Professor of Law at Harvard Law School, Jacob E. Gersen. 

Suk's sister, Julie Suk, is a Professor of Law at Fordham University School of Law.

See also 
 List of law clerks of the Supreme Court of the United States (Seat 3)

References

External links
 Jeannie Suk (31:54 mins video) YouTube. Last Lecture Series, Harvard Law School.

1973 births
Living people
Alumni of St Hugh's College, Oxford
American academics of Korean descent
American legal scholars
American scholars of constitutional law
American women academics
American women lawyers
American women legal scholars
Harvard Law School alumni
Harvard Law School faculty
Hunter College High School alumni
Law clerks of the Supreme Court of the United States
Marshall Scholars
The New Yorker people
Yale University alumni